mRNA-decapping enzyme 2 is a protein that in humans is encoded by the DCP2 gene.

DCP2 is a key component of an mRNA-decapping complex required for removal of the 5-prime cap from mRNA prior to its degradation from the 5-prime end (Fenger-Gron et al., 2005).[supplied by OMIM]

Interactions 

DCP2 has been shown to interact with DCP1A and UPF1.

References

Further reading 

 
 
 
 
 
 
 
 
 
 
 
 
 
 

Nudix hydrolases